Moira, or The Mystery of the Bush is a 1912 Australian silent film directed by Alfred Rolfe.

It is considered a lost film.

It may also be known as Call of the Bush.

Plot
Some aboriginals steal a child in rural Australia. Fifteen years later the father of the girl discovers her although he does not know who she is at first. Eventually the two are reunited.

Cast
Charles Villiers

References

External links
 
The Moira, or Mystery of the Bush at AustLit

Australian black-and-white films
Australian silent feature films
Lost Australian films
Films directed by Alfred Rolfe
1912 films